USS Kanised (SP-439) was a United States Navy patrol vessel in commission from 1917 to 1919.

Kanised was built as the private motor yacht Tuscanola in 1909 or 1910 at Long Branch, New Jersey. She later was renamed Nahmeoka and then Kanised.

On 8 May 1917, the U.S. Navy acquired Kanised from her owner, Louis Kann of Baltimore, Maryland, for use as a section patrol vessel during World War I. She was commissioned as USS Kanised (SP-439) on 12 May 1917.

Assigned to the 5th Naval District at Norfolk, Virginia, Kanised operated in the Hampton Roads, Virginia, area for the rest of World War I. She served as a mail ship, on harbor patrol, and as flagship of Squadron 4 on the section patrol.

After World War I ended on 11 November 1918, Kanised remained at Norfolk, where she was stricken from the Navy List on 31 March 1919 and sold on 13 December 1919 to J. A. Mickelson of Morris Heights, the Bronx, New York.

Notes

References

Department of the Navy Naval History and Heritage Command Online Library of Selected Images: Civilian Ships: Kanised (American Motor Boat, 1909). Previously named Tuscanola and Nahmeoka. Served as USS Kanised (SP-439) in 1917-1919
NavSource Online: Section Patrol Craft Photo Archive: Kanised (SP 439)

Patrol vessels of the United States Navy
World War I patrol vessels of the United States
Ships built in New Jersey
1909 ships
1910 ships
Individual yachts